Jack Douglas may refer to:

 Jack Douglas (actor) (1927–2008), British actor and comedian
 Jack Douglas (footballer, born 1872) (1872–1905), Australian rules footballer
 Jack Douglas (footballer, born 1929) (1929–2007), Australian rules footballer
 Jack Douglas (ice hockey) (1930–2003), Canadian ice hockey player
 Jack Douglas (record producer), American record producer
 Jack Douglas (writer) (1908–1989), American comedy writer
 Jon Douglas, known as Jack, American tennis player and college football quarterback
 Jack Douglas (television host) (1921–1994), television host and producer

See also
 Jacksfilms (John Patrick "Jack" Douglass; born 1988), American Internet personality
 John Douglas (disambiguation)